This is a list of buildings that are examples of Art Deco in Asia:

Cambodia 
 Central Market (Phsar Thom Thmei), Phnom Penh, Phnom Penh, 1937
 Central Market, Battambang
 Royal railway station, Phnom Penh, 1932

China 
 Bank of China (formerly the Xinje Bank), Nanjing, 1937
 Oi Kwan Hotel, Canton, 1937

Shanghai 
source: 
 , Shanghai, 1941
 Astrid Building, Shanghai, 1933
 Avenue Apartments, Shanghai, 1932
 Bank of China Building, Shanghai, Shanghai, 1937
 Bank of Shanghai/Shangha Federation of Trade Unions (formerly the China Bank of Communications), Shanghai, 1949
 Bank of Taiwan Building, Shanghai, 1924
 Broadway Mansions, Shanghai, 1935
 , Shanghai, 1932
 , Shanghai, 1926
 , Shanghai, 1936
 Chinese YMCA, Shanghai, 1934
 Defense of Sihang Warehouse, Shanghai, 1931
 Denis Apartments, Shanghai, 1928
 Dubail Apartments, Shanghai, 1931
 Dufour Apartments, Shanghai, 1939
 Embankment Building, Shanghai, 1932
 Empire Mansions, Shanghai, 1931
 Engineering Building at the Xuhui campus – Jiao Tong University, Shanghai, 1932
 Eye and ENT Hospital of Fudan University, Shanghai, 1934
 Fuyou Road Mosque, Shanghai, 1936
 Gascogne Apartments, Shanghai, 1935
 , Shanghai, 1932
 Grand Cinema, Shanghai, 1933
 Green House/Woo Villa (Laszlo Hudec, now the Urban Design and Planning Institute), Shanghai, 1938
 Hamilton House, Shanghai, 1931
 Hengshan Picardie Hotel, Shanghai, 1934
 Huaihai Lu, Avenue Joffre, Shanghai
 Institut Pasteur of Shanghai (formerly Musee Heude), Shanghai, 1930
 Jiangwan Sports Center (stadium, natatorium), Shanghai, 1934
 Jinjiang Hotel (former Cathay Mansion, 1929 and Grosvenor House, 1934), Shanghai
 , Shanghai, 1936
 , Shanghai, 1941
 Medhurst Apartments, Shanghai, 1934
 New Asia Hotel, Hongkou, Shanghai, 1934
 Paramount (Shanghai), Shanghai, 1933
 Park Hotel, Shanghai, 1934)
 Peace Hotel (Part of The Bund, Palmer & Turner),  Shanghai, 1929
 Pei Mansion, Shanghai, 1934
 Rainbow Apartments, Shanghai
 Renji Hospital (formerly Lester Chinese Hospital), Shanghai, 1932
 Rockbund Art Museum, Shanghai, China, 1933
 Stellar International Cineplex, Shanghai, 1932
 Villas Hotel, Shanghai, 1930s
 Washington Apartments, Shanghai, 1928
 Wheelock and Co. Sichuan Mansion, Shanghai, 1943
 Wukang Mansion/Normandie Apartments, Shanghai, 1924

Hong Kong 
 Bank of China Building, Hong Kong, 1951
 The Peninsula Hong Kong, Hong Kong, 1928
 Yau Ma Tei Theatre, Hong Kong, 1930

India 
 Ahmedabad Town Hall
 Electricity House - Vijali Ghar, Ahmedabad, Gujarat
 The Imperial Hotel, New Delhi, 1931
 Magen Avraham Synagogue, Ahmedabad, Gujarat, 1934
 Prabhat Talkies, Mangalore, 
 Rajeshwari Theatre - Konankunte, Kon, Bangalore, Karnataka
 Umaid Bhawan Palace indoor pool, Jaipur, 1928–1943

Chennai 
 Andhra Insurance Buildings, Chennai, 1940
 Casino Theatre, Chennai, 1941
 Catholic Centre, Chennai, 1951
 Dare House (EID Parry Building), Chennai, 1940
 Kamadhenu Theatre, Chennai, 1945
 Kasturi Buildings (The Hindu), Chennai, 1939
 Oriental Buildings, Chennai, 1935
 Taj Connemara, Chennai, 1854, 1937

Mumbai 
source: 
 Eros Cinema, Mumbai, 1935
 Government Law College, Mumbai, 1938
 Indian Merchant's Chamber building, Mumbai, 1939
 Kapadia Chambers apartments, Mumbai
 Metro Cinema, Mumbai, 1938
 N.M. Petit Fasli Agiary, Mumbai, 1939
 New Empire Cinema, Mumbai, 1908, 1948
 New India Assurance Building, Mumbai, 1936
 Regal Cinema, Mumbai, 1933
 Shri Ganesh Krupa, Shivaji Park, Mumbai
 Taraporewala Aquarium, Mumbai, 1951
 United Building, Mumbai

Indonesia 
 BKS PPS (Badan Kerja-sama Perusahaan Perkebunan Sumatera), (Sumatra Planters Association), Medan, North Sumatra, 1918
 Cirebon City Hall, Cirebon City, West Java, 1927
 Immanuel Protestant Church (formerly Nederlandse Hervormde Kerk), Medan, North Sumatra, 1921
 Medan Railway Station, Medan, North Sumatra, 1937
 Post Office, Medan, North Sumatra, 1911
 former Varekamp & Co. bookstore and printers, Medan, North Sumatra

Bandung 
 Bank BJB Syariah, Bandung, West Java
 Bank Pacific, Bandung, West Java, 1925
 , Bandung, West Java
  (now Prama Grand Preanger), Bandung, West Java, 1929
 Hotel Swarha, Bandung, West Java, 1935
 Kologdam Building, Bandung, West Java, 1920
 List of colonial buildings in Bandung, Bandung, West Java
 Merdeka Building, Bandung, West Java, 1926
 Museum Geologi, Bandung, West Java, 1928
 New Majestic, Bandung, West Java, 1924
 Savoy Homann Hotel, (Designed by Albert Aalbers), Bandung, West Java, 1939
 Villa Isola, (Bumi Silliwangi, Designed by C.P. Wolff Schoemaker), Bandung, West Java, 1932

Jakarta 
 Asuransi Jasa Indonesia building (formerly the West Java Handel Society), Jakarta, 1920
 Bank Mandiri Museum, Jakarta, 1933
 Jakarta Kota railway station, Jakarta, 1928
 Manggarai railway station, Jakarta, 1818
 Mausoleum O. G. Khouw, Jakarta, 1927
 Metropole Jakarta, Jakarta, 1932–1949
 Tanjung Priuk railway station, Jakarta, 1925

Iran 
 College of Engineering, University of Tehran, Tehran, 1942
 Ministry of Justice, Tehran, 1930s
 National Bank at the Bazaar, Tehran
 Ramsar Hotel, Ramsar, Mazandaran, 1933
 School for Orphans, Tehran
 Tabriz Railway Station, Tabriz, 1916, 1958

Israel
 Alhambra Cinema, Jaffa, 1937
 British War Cemetery, Jerusalem, 1927
 Generali Building, Jerusalem
 Great Synagogue, Tel Aviv, 1926 (eclectic with Art Deco elements)
 Gymnasia Rehavia high school, Rehavia, Jerusalem, 1928
 Herzl Street 11, Tel Aviv
 , now  of Banking and Tel Aviv Nostalgia, Tel Aviv, 1909, 1924
 Jerusalem International YMCA, Jerusalem, 1933
 Jewish Agency Headquarters, Rehavia, Jerusalem, 1929
 Levant Fair grounds, Tel Aviv, 1923–1936
 , Tel Aviv, 1930
 Old City Hall, Tel Aviv, 1924
 Palm Tree House, Tel Aviv, 1922
 former Preservation Building, Herzl Street, Tel Aviv, 1930s
 , now Israel Electric Corporation building, Tel Aviv, 1923
 Reading Power Station, Tel Aviv, 1938
 Rehavia neighborhood, Jerusalem, 1924
 , Tel Aviv, 1931
 Villa Salameh, now Belgian Consulate, Jerusalem, 1930

Japan
  (Ichikyunachi Building) Kyoto, 1928
 Aimoto Power Station, Kurobe
  store, Osaka, 1933
 former Japanese National Railways Kyushu Area Headquarters and former Mitsui & Co. branch, Moji-ku, Kitakyūshū, 1937
 former JR Kyushu Northern Kyushu Area Headquarters, Moji-ku, Kitakyūshū, 1935
 Hikawa Maru ship, Yokohama, 1929
 Hiroshima Peace Memorial, Hiroshima, 1915
 Hotel New Grand, Yokohama, 1927
 Imperial Hotel, Chiyoda, Tokyo, 1923
 Isetan Shinjuku main store, Shinjuku, Tokyo, 1933
 Kangawa Prefectural Building, Yokohama, 1928
 , Kyoto, 1937
 Kansai Japanese-French Academy, Sakyo-ku, Kyoto, 1936
 Kobe City Archives (formerly Ikenaga Museum of Art), Kobe, 1938
 , Kobe, 1927
 Kōshien Hotel/Kōshien Kaikan, Mukogawa Women's University, Nishinomiya, Hyōgo, 1930
  (formerly Nozawaya department store), Kanagawa, 1928
 Osaka City University Building No. 1, Osaka, 1934
 Osaka Security Exchange, Osaka, 1949
 , Chuo-ku, Osaka, 1926
 , Chuoku, Osaka City, 1923
 , Mitarai, Kure, 1937
 , Nada-ku, Kobe, 1932
 Toyama Prefectural Office Building, Toyama, 1935
 Toyosato Elementary School old building and auditorium, Shiga, 1937
 , Yokohama, 1936
 Yokohama Customs Building, Yokohama, 1934
 Yokohama Port Opening Memorial Hall, Yokohama, 1937

Tokyo 
 Asakusa Station/Matsuya department store, Taito, Tokyo, 1931
 Ginza Wako, Tokyo, 1923
 , Chiyoda-ku, Tokyo, 1930
  (Yamanoue Hotel), Chiyoda, Tokyo, 1953
 Lion Beer Hall, Tokyo, 1934
 Mitsukoshi Nihonbashi, Tokyo, 1925
 Mitsukoshimae Station passageway, Tokyo, 1932
 National Diet Building, Chiyoda, Tokyo, 1936
 St. Luke's International Hospital, Tsukiji, Chuo, Tokyo, 1902, 1924
 Tokiwadai Photo Studio, Edo-Tokyo Open Air Architectural Museum, Tokyo, 1937
 Tokyo Metropolitan Teien Art Museum, (Prince Asaka Residence), Tokyo, 1933
 Tosho Bunko Library, Kita, Tokyo

Laos 
 Lao Chaleune Theatre, Savannakhet, 1930s
 Siensavan Cinema, Wat Visoun, Luang Prabang
 Soumpholphakdy House, Savannakhet, 1926

Lebanon 
 Cinema Opera and Ezzeddine Building, Beirut, 1932
 Corm Building and Gardens (Ford Motor Company's Middle East headquarters), Beirut, 1929
 National Museum of Beirut, Beirut, 1937
 Nejme Square/Place de l'Étoile (including the Abed Clock Tower, Lebanese Parliament building), Beirut

Macau 
 , Macau, 1952
 Teatro Apollo (now Esprit store), Macau, 1935

Malaysia 
Capitol Theatre, Jalan Bendahara, Malacca, 1936
KTM Museum (former Johor Bahru railway station), Johor, 1909
Lido Cinema, Kota Bharu, Kelantan
Lido Theatre, Dato Onn Jafar, Ipoh, 1957
Majestic Theater, Jalan Chamberlain Hulu, Ipoh, 1940s
Ruby Cinema, Ipoh
Sultan Sulaiman Mosque, Selangor, 1934
 Sungai Petani clock tower, Sungai Petani, Kedah, 1936

George Town, Penang 
City Rio Cafe, George Town, Penang
Georgetown Cinema, George Town,Penang
India House, George Town, Penang
Maison De Poupée (former Garage), George Town, Penang
Odeon Cinema, George Town, Penang
 Penang Masonic Temple, George Town,Penang, 1927
 Standard Chartered Bank, George Town,Penang
The Star Theatre, George Town,Penang

Kuala Lumpur 
 Capitol Theatre, Kuala Lumpur, 1947
Central Market, Kuala Lumpur, 1937
 Coliseum Theatre, Kuala Lumpur, 1920
 Lee Rubber Building, High Street, Kuala Lumpur, 1930
 Market Square clock tower (behind Central Market), Kuala Lumpur, 1937
 Odeon Cinema, Jalan Tuanku Abdul Rahman, Kuala Lumpur, 1936
 Old OCBC Building, Kuala Lumpur, 1938
 Oriental Building, Kuala Lumpur, 1937
Pavilion Cinema, Kuala Lumpur
 Perpustakaan Kanak-kanak children's library, Kuala Lumpur
 Rubber Research Institute, Jalan Ampang, Kuala Lumpur, 1935
 Wisma Ekran (Central Market), Kuala Lumpur, 1888, 1937

Myanmar 
 Aung Mingala Cinema, Dawei, Tanintharyi Region
 City Lite Cinema Hall, Myitkyina, Kachin State, 1951
Hla Thiri Cinema, Minbu, Magwe Division, 1959
 Kemarat Cinema, Kengtung, Shan State
King's Cinema, Mawlamyine, Mon State
Min Thiha Cinema, Katha, Sagaing Region
 Myoe Gon Yaung Cinema, Mandalay, Mandalay Region
Myoma Cinema, Pyin Oo Lwin, Mandalay Region
San Thit Cinema, Ma-ubin, Irrawady Region, 1963
 Sein Mit Tar, Hsipaw, Shan Statem 1964
 Shwe Hintha Cinema, Bago, Bago Region
 Starlight Cinema, Bhamo, Khachin State, 1959
Tun Thiri Cinema, Pyay, Bago Region
Win Cinema, Taungoo, Bago Region, 1961
Win Lite Cinema, Mandalay, Mandalay Region
 Yazuna Cinema, Pyin Oo Lwin, Mandalay Region
 Za Bue De Par Cinema, Bhamo, Kachin State

Yangon 
 Agricultural Development Bank, Yangon, 1930
Bayint Cinema (King Cinema), Yangon
 Hsuhtupan Cinema, Yangon
Myanma Economic Bank No. 2, (formerly the Chartered Bank), Yangon, 1941
 Myanma Port Authority, Yangon
Myoma and Shwe Gon Cinemas, Yangon, late 1940s
 Nay Pyi Daw Cinema Hall, Yangon
Su Htoo Pan Cinema, Yangon
 Thakin Kodaw Hmaing Museum, Yangon, 1966
 Thamada Cinema, Yangon
 Thwin Cinema, Yangon
 Wayiza Cinema, Yangon
Yadana Pon Cinema, Yangon

Pakistan 
 House of Syed Abul A'la Maududi, Lahore
 Qamar House, Karachi, 1951

Philippines 
 Antipolo Cathedral, Antipolo, Rizal, 1954
 Bauan Municipal Hall, Juan M. Arellano, Bauan, Batangas, 1930
 City Hall, Surigao City, Surigao del Norte
 Daku Balay, (Salvador Cinco), Bacolod City, Negros Occidental, 1936
 Dr. Jose Corteza Locsin Ancestral House, Silay, Negros Occidental, 1930s
 Far Eastern University Campus, Sampaloc, Manila, 1940s
 Hotel Tiffany, Laoag, Ilocos Norte
 Immaculate Conception Cathedral, Urdaneta, Pangasinan
 Misamis Occidental Provincial Capitol, Oroquieta, Misamis Occidental, 1935
 Provincial Capitol, Surigao City, Surigao del Norte
 Roman Catholic Church, Oroquieta, Misamis Occidental
 Tacloban City Hall, Tacloban, Leyte
 Tanauan Museum (old municipal building), Tanauan, Leyte, 1920s
 La Union Provincial Capitol, San Fernando, La Union
 Vi-Car Building, Dagupan, Pangasinan

Benguet Province 
 Baguio Colleges, Baguio, Benguet
 Bayanihan Hotel and Commercial Building, Baguio, Benguet
 Benguet Auto Lines Station, Baguio, Benguet
 Hotel City Lunch, Baguio, Benguet
 Iglesia ni Cristo Lokal ng Baguio, Baguio, 1954
 Philippine Military Academy (PMA) Melchor Hall, Baguio, Benguet, 1950
 Pines Theater, Fernando H. Ocampo, Baguio, Benguet, 1939
 Philippine National Bank (PNB), Baguio, Baguio, Benguet
 Plaza Theater, Baguio, Benguet
 Session Road buildings Baguio, Benguet
 Session Theater, (Fernando Ocampo), Baguio, Benguet
 Sunshine Bakery, Baguio, Benguet

Bulacan Province 
 Bulacan Provincial Capitol, Malolos, Bulacan, 1930
 Calumpit Municipal Hall, Calumpit, Bulacan
 Dr. Luis Santos Ancestral House, Malolos, Bulacan, 1933
 Ipo Dam Tower, Norzagaray, Bulacan, 1935
 Malolos City Hall, Malolos, Bulacan

Camarines Sur Province 
 Alex Theater, Naga, Camarines Sur
 Carmelite Chapel, Naga, Camarines Sur
 Jaucian House, Libmanan, Camarines Sur, 1926
 Morales Ruins, Libmanan, Camarines Sur, 1937
 Nacieno House, Libmanan, Camarines Sur

Cebu Province 
 Alliance française, Cebu City, Cebu
 Cebu Provincial Capitol, (Juan M. Arellano), Cebu City, Cebu, 1938
 Gotiaoco Building, Cebu City, Cebu
 Lapulapu Monument, Lapu-Lapu City/Opon, Cebu, 1933(demolished)
 Oriente Theater (Fernando Ocampo), Cebu City, Cebu
 University of the Philippines Cebu administration building, Cebu City, Cebu

Manila 
source: 
  Afable Building, Manila, 1931
 Aguinaldo's Building, Manila, 1931
 Angela Apartments, (Fernando Ocampo), Manila, 1936
 Astoria Building, Manila
 Ateneo Auditorium, (Juan Nakpil), Manila, 1936
 Avenue Theater, (Juan Nakpil), Manila (demolished)
 Bautista-Nakpil Pylon in Manila North Cemetery, (Juan Nakpil), Santa Cruz, Manila
 Bel-Air Apartments, (Pablo Antonio), Manila 1937
 Bellevue Theater, Manila, 1930s
 Benipayo Press building, Manila
 Capitan Gonzaga Residence, (Pablo Antonio), Manila
 Capitol Theater, (Juan Nakpil) Manila, 1935
 Central Hotel, (Capitan Pepe Building, Juan Nakpil), Manila, 1938
 Central Institute of Technology, Manila
 Centro Escolar University, Manila
 Chapel of the Crucified Christ, Saint Paul University Manila (Andrés Luna de San Pedro), Manila, 1927
 Chapel of the Most Blessed Sacrament, De La Salle University (Tomás Mapúa), Manila, 1939
 Chevrolet building, Romualdez Street, north of U.N. Avenue, Manila (demolished)
 Cine Astor, Manila (demolished)
 Coca-Cola Bottling Plant, (Gabler-Gumbert), Manila
 Commercial building on Calle Santa Potenciana corner Calle Solana
 Crystal Arcade, (Andrés Luna de San Pedro, 1932)(demolished)
 De Ocampo Eye Clinic, Manila (demolished)
 Elena Apartments, (Juan Nakpil), Manila, 1935 (demolished)
 Ever Theater, Manila
 Far Eastern University, (Pablo Antonio), Manila, 1939–49
 First United Building, (Andrés Luna de San Pedro), Manila, 1928
 Forum Theatre, (Juan Nakpil), Manila, 1968
 Francisco Villa Roman Foundation School, (Juan Nakpil), Malate, Manila
 Gaiety Theater, (Juan Nakpil), Manila, 1935 (demolished)
 G. Apacible Bridge, Manila
 Go Lam Co Hardware & Plumbing Co. Building, Manila
 Grand Theater, Manila (demolished)
 Great Eastern Hotel, Manila (demolished)-This was the tallest art-deco hotel in the Philippines.
 Hap Hong Building, Manila, 1938
 Heacock Building, (Fernando Ocampo, Tomas Arguelles, and George Koster), Manila, 1938(demolished)
 Hidalgo-Lim house, (Juan Nakpil), Manila, 1930
 High Commissioner's Residence, 1940
 Hotel Filipinas, (Chow King, Recto Ave. cor. Rizal Ave.), Manila
 Ideal Theater, (Pablo Antonio), Manila, 1933 (demolished)
 Ides O'Racca Building, Manila, 1935
 Iglesia Unida Ecumenical Templo Central, Manila
 Insular Life Building, (Fernando de la Cantera and William James Odom), Manila, 1930 (demolished)
 Javellana house (Juan Nakpil), Manila (demolished)
 L. R. Papa Pension, Manila
 La Estrella del Norte building, (Savory Restaurant), Manila (demolished)
 Lacson house (Juan Nakpil), Manila (demolished)
 Laperal Apartments, Manila (demolished)
 Life Theater, (Pablo Antonio), Manila, 1941
 Lyric Theater (Pablo Antonio renovation), Manila, 1937 (demolished)
 Manila Central University Administration and Pharmacy, Manila
 Manila Hotel, (Andrés Luna de San Pedro, 1935 renovation)
 Manila Jai Alai Building, (Welton Beckett, 1940) (demolished)
 Manila Metropolitan Theater, (Juan M. Arellano), Manila, 1931
 Manila Police District building, Manila
 Manila Port Terminal Building, Manila, 1939
 Manuel F. Tiaoqui Building, Santa Cruz, Manila
 Marsman Building, (Port Authority Building, Juan Arellano), Manila, 1938
 Mayflower Building, Manila, 1938
 Meralco Building, (Juan Nakpil), Manila, 1936 (demolished)
 Miramar Apartments (New Miramar Hotel), Manila, 1932
 Myers Building, (Velco Building), Manila
 Narcisa Building, Manila
 National Teachers College, Manila
 Orchid Garden Hotel, (Pablo Antonio), Manila, 1930
 Pako Building, Manila, 1939
 Paterno Building, (Fernando Ocampo), Manila, 1929
 Philippine Business for Social Progress building, Manila
 Philippine Christian University, Manila
 Philippine Coast Guard Building, Manila
 Pink house on Paris Street, Manila (demolished)
 Quezon Bridge, Manila, 1939
 Radio Theater, Manila, 1929 (demolished)
 Ramon Roces Building, (Pablo Antonio), Manila
 Rex Theater, Manila
 Rizal Memorial Baseball Stadium, Manila, 1934
 Rizal Memorial Coliseum, Manila, 1934
 Rizal Memorial Sports Complex, Malate, Manila, 1934
 Rizal Memorial Stadium, Manila, 1934
 Saint Cecilia's Hall, St. Scholastica's College, (Andrés Luna de San Pedro), Manila, 1932
 San Lazaro Racetrack, (Juan Nakpil), Manila (demolished)
 Scala Theater, (Pablo Antonio), Manila
 Scottish Rite Temple, Manila, 1930s
 Singson Building, Manila
 South Syquia Apartments, Manila
 St. Paul United Methodist Church, Manila
 State Theater, (Juan Nakpil), Manila, 1935 (demolished)
 Syquia Building/Michel Apartments, (Francis Mandelbaum), Manila (demolished)-This was the tallest art-deco apartment building in the Philippines.
 Times Theater, (Luis Araneta), Manila, 1939
 Tivoli Theater, Manila (demolished)
 U.S.T. Central Seminary, (Fernando H. Ocampo), Manila, 1933
 U.S.T. Clinic, Cooperative, Gym, High School, Manila
 U.S.T. Press building, Manila, 1950 (demolished)
 U.P. University Theater, Manila (demolished)
 University Club, (de la Cantera), Manila (demolished)
 University of Santo Tomas Central Seminary Building, Manila, 1933
 Uy Su Bin Building, Manila
 Warehouse, Railroad St. corner 22nd St., Manila
 Y.I.C. Building, Manila (demolished)
 Yutivo Building, (Arthur Julius Nicolaus Gabler-Gumbert), Manila, 1922
 YSS Laboratories building, Manila

Metro Manila 
 Baclaran Church, Parañaque, 1932
 Balintawak Beer Brewery (demolished), Valenzuela
 Biological Production Service building, Muntinlupa
 Bonifacio Monument, Guillermo Tolentino, Caloocan, 1933
 Cine Concepcion, (Pablo Antonio), Malabon, 1940 (demolished)
 Clipper Hotel, Makati
 Gomez Mansions, Pasay
 Greendale Supermarket (Savemore), Marikina
 Guardhouse south of Petron station, C-5, Barangay Ugong, Pasig, (demolished)
 Hospital Español de Santiago, Makati, 1932 (demolished)
 Iglesia Ni Cristo chapel (Locale of F. Manalo), San Juan, 1952
 Iglesia ni Cristo Lokal ng Caloocan, Caloocan, 1953
 Iglesia ni Cristo Lokal ng Pasay, Pasay, 1954
 Iglesia ni Cristo Lokal ng Paco, Paco, Manila, 1957
 Lambingan Bridge, San Juan
 Manila Polo Club, (Pablo Antonio), Makati, 1950
 Manila Sanitarium, (Adventist Medical Center Manila), Pasay, 1929
 Mapúa Mansion, Pasay, 1930
 Morosi Theater, Pasay (demolished)
 Municipal Building, Makati
 Nielson Field Tower, Makati, 1937
 Santa Ana Racetrack, Makati (demolished)
 Savoy Bistro, Makati
 Syjuco Bel-air Apartments, Makati
 University of Makati Stadium, Makati
 Wack Wack Golf and Country Club, Mandaluyong, 1930
 White Cross Orphanage (Pablo Antonio), San Juan, 1938

Nueva Ecija 
 Iglesia ni Cristo Lokal ng Cabanatuan, Cabanatuan, Nueva Ecija, 1957

Mindanao island 
 Court of First Instance and City Jail, (demolished), Davao City
 Dakudao Building, Davao City
 Garcia Building, Davao City
 PNB building, Davao City
 Provincial Capitol, Cagayan de Oro
 PTA Stadium, Davao City

Panay island 
 Angelicum School Iloilo, Iloilo City
 Banco Nacional de las Filipinas, Iloilo City
 Cementerio Catolico de Molo, Iloilo City
 Iloilo Central Market, Iloilo City
 Jaro Municipal Hall, (Juan M. Arellano), Iloilo City, 1935
 Ledesma Mansion, Iloilo City
 Lopez Heritage House, Boat House, (Fernando Ocampo) Jaro, Iloilo City, 1936
 Lopez Heritage House (Nelly's Gardens Mansion), Jaro, Iloilo City, 1928
 Pablo Dulalia Building, Iloilo City, 1932
 Philippine Tuberculosis Society Building, Iloilo City
 S. Villanueva Building, Iloilo City
 Salvador Building, Iloilo City
 YMCA, Iloilo City

Quezon City 
 19 June Bridge, Quezon City
 AFP GHQ Building, Quezon City
 AFP Medical Center, Quezon City
 Balara Filters Plant, Quezon City
 Camp Aguinaldo guardhouses, Quezon City
 Christ the King Mission Seminary, Quezon City
 Manahan Building, Quezon City
 Mira-Nila House
 Mount Carmel Church, Quezon City
 National Cathedral of Saint Mary and Saint John, Quezon City
 National Children's Hospital, Quezon City (demolished)
 National Shrine of Our Lady of Lourdes, Quezon City
 Quezon City General Hospital, Quezon City
 Quezon Institute, (Juan Nakpil,), Quezon City, 1938
 Quezon Memorial Circle (Federico Ilustre), Quezon City, This is the tallest art-deco structure in the Philippines.
 Saint Joseph's College of Quezon City gateposts and fence, Quezon City
 Sacred Heart Parish Kamuning, Quezon City
 Santander Building, Quezon City
 Santo Domingo Church, (Jose Maria Zaragosa), Quezon City
 Siena College of Quezon City, Quezon City
 Standard Photo Engraving Co. building, Quezon City
 UERM, Quezon City
 U.P. Quezon Hall (Juan Nakpil), Gonzales Hall (Nakpil), Palma Hall (Cesar Concio), Melchor Hall (Concio), Carillon Tower (Nakpil), Luna Parade Ground flagpole base, Molave Residence Hall, Quezon City
 Veterans Memorial Medical Center guardhouse, Quezon City
 Welcome Monument (Luciano V. Aquino), Quezon City, 1948

Quezon Province 
 Gala-Rodriguez Ancestral House (Juan Nakpil), Sariaya, Quezon, 1935
 Municipal Hall, Tiaong, Quezon
 Natalio Enriquez House (Andres Luna de San Pedro), Sariaya, Quezon
 Quezon Provincial Capitol, (Juan M. Arellano), Lucena, Quezon, 1935
 Sariaya Municipal Building, (Juan M. Arellano), Sariaya, Quezon, 1931

Singapore 
source:
 36 and 38 Armenian Street, Singapore
 Asia Insurance Building, Singapore, 1958
 Capitol Theatre, Singapore, 1930
 Clifford Pier, Collier Quay, Singapore, 1933
 former Ford Factory, Bukit Timah, Singapore, 1942
 Kallang Airport, Singapore, 1937
 Majestic Theatre (formerly the Tien Yien Moh Toi Theatre), Chinatown, 1938
 Murray Terrace, Singapore, 1929
 Parkview Square, 2002
 Rex Cinemas Mackenzie, 1964
 Tanjong Pagar railway station, Tanjong Pagar, 1932
 The Cathay, Singapore, 1937
 The Great Madras, Little India, Singapore
 Tiong Bahru housing estate, Bukit Merah Planning Area, 1920s
 Vagabond Club, Garcha Hotel, Singapore, 1950

South Korea 
source:
 former Busan Meteorological Observatory, Busan, 1934
 , Seoul, 1921
 , Gwangju, 1927
 former City Hall, Seoul, 1925
  (formerly Daegu Medical College), Kyungpook National University, Daegu, 1933
 , Seoul, 1923
 former Ilseon Shipping Office, Incheon, 1930s
 Kyungpook National University Hospital (the former Provincial Daegu Hospital, Daegu, 1928,
 , Seoul, 1936
 Seoul Metropolitan Council building, Seoul, 1925
 , Gungwon-do, Hongcheon-gun Seosok-myeon, 1935

Sri Lanka 
 Deco on 44 Hotel, Lighthouse Street, Galle, 1930s
 Galle Face Court, Galle Road, Colombo, 1930s
 Imperial Theatre, Kurunegala
 Kandy Railway Station, Kandy
 Walker Sons and Company Building, Layden Bastian Road, Colombo
 YMCA, Bristol Street, Colombo

Thailand 
 Laung Sitra Tapakarn's residence, Ratchaburi
New Chalerm Uthai Theater, Uthai Thani, early 1940s
O.K. Rama, Suphanburi
 Phra Ram Ratchaniwet (Ban Puen Palace for King Chulalongkorn), Petchaburi, 1916
 St. Josef Church, Ban Pong, Ratchaburi
Thahan Bok Theater, Lopburi, 1941
 Wik Kru Thawee Theatre, Ratchaburi, 1958

Bangkok 
 Bangkok Railway Station (Hua Lamphong Station), Pathum Wan District, Bangkok, 1916
 Democracy Monument, Bangkok, 1939
 General Post Office, Bangkok, 1940
 National Stadium, Pathum Wan District, Bangkok, 1937
 Rajadamnern Stadium (Sanam Muay Rajadamnern boxing stadium), Bangkok, 1945
 Rama I Road Yotse bridge-Kasat Suek bridge, Bangkok, 1929
 The Royal Hotel
 Sala Chalermkrung Royal Theatre, Bangkok, 1933
 Thon Buri Railway station, Bangkok Noi District, Bangkok, 1950
 Victory Monument, Ratchathewi District, 1942
 The 1940s-era buildings along the middle section of Ratchadamnoen (Kingswalk) Avenue
 Scala Cinema, Bangkok, 1969

Vietnam 
 Bach Mai Hospital (formerly René Robin Hospital), Hanoi, 1940
 Banque de l'Indochine (now State Bank of Vietnam), Hanoi, 1930s
 Clinique Building (former hospital), French Quarter, Hanoi, 1920s
 Cửa Bắc Church, Hanoi, 1925, 1932
 Da Lat Palace Hotel, Da Lat, 1922
 Da Lat Railway Station, Da Lat, 1932, 1938
 Domaine de Marie Catholic convent, Da Lat, 1940
 Emperor Bao Dai's Summer Palace, Da Lat
 Ho Chi Minh City Museum of Fine Arts, Ho Chi Minh, 1934
 Hotel de l'Opera Hanoi, Hanoi
 IDEO printing house, Hanoi
 Ministry of Foreign Affairs, Hanoi, 1945
 State Bank of Vietnam, Hanoi

See also 

 List of Art Deco architecture
 Art Deco topics
 Streamline Moderne architecture

References 

 
Art Deco